Nennius may refer to:

 Nennius, Welsh monk of the 9th century traditionally considered to be author of the Historia Brittonum
 Nennius of Britain, mythical prince of Britain at the time of Julius Caesar's invasions of Britain (55–54 BC)
 Saint Nennius, 6th-century Irish abbot known as one of the twelve apostles of Ireland
 Nennius, a synonym for Polygonus, a genus of butterflies